Killing Peace is the fourth studio album by English thrash metal band Onslaught, released in 2007. It was their first album since 1989's In Search of Sanity and the first to feature Sy Keeler since 1986's The Force.

Critical reception
Reception to Onslaught was fairly similar, with generally positive receptions noting that the album bought nothing new to the genre while being a great hit hearkening back to thrash rock of the 1980s.

Exclaim! was positive to the cheesy lyrics combined with traditional thrash music, saying that it avoided the common failures of reinventing the genre and instead stood as a "a salute to the long-gone days of 80's thrash".

While AllMusic again noted there was nothing groundbreaking, there was enthusiasm for their performance "the material is excellent, the performances inspired, crisp and undeniably focused" and a good comeback springboard to their earlier albums.

Blabbermouth.net was more negative, rating them as a 2nd-tier album between the big names and niche outfits, complaining both about the lack of originality but the monotonous nature in the latter half of the album. They also gave positives, stating that purists would be massive fans, with high quality solos and occasional moments of brilliance.

Track listing

Note
 The bonus track "Power from Hell" is a Japanese only exclusive, with lyrics in the booklet written in English, additional inner with lyrics and information in Japanese and OBI strip

Credits
 Sy Keeler - vocals
 Alan Jordan - guitar
 Nige Rockett - guitar
 James Hinder - bass
 Steve Grice - drums

References

2007 albums
Onslaught (band) albums
Candlelight Records albums
Albums produced by Andy Sneap